The 2022 Central Arkansas Bears football team represented the University of Central Arkansas as a member of the ASUN Conference during the 2022 NCAA Division I FCS football season. The Bears were led by fifth-year head coach Nathan Brown and played their home games at Estes Stadium.

Previous season

The Bears finished the 2021 season with 5–6 overall record, 3–4 in ASUN play.

Schedule

Game summaries

No. 5 Missouri State

at No. 22 (FBS) Ole Miss

at Idaho State

at Southeast Missouri State

No. 22 Austin Peay

Lindenwood

at Kennesaw State

North Alabama

at Eastern Kentucky

at Stephen F. Austin

Jacksonville State

References

Central Arkansas
Central Arkansas Bears football seasons
Central Arkansas Bears football